The eastern woodhaunter (Automolus subulatus), also known as the Amazonian woodhaunter, is a species of bird in the family Furnariidae. It was formerly treated as conspecific with the western woodhaunter and when lumped had the name "striped woodhaunter". It is found in the western part of the Amazon rainforest: west Brazil, southeast Colombia, east Ecuador, northeast Peru, south Venezuela and north Bolivia. Its natural habitats are subtropical or tropical moist lowland forests and subtropical or tropical moist montane forests. The species nests in earth tunnels.

At one time the species was included in the genus Hyloctistes but molecular phylogenetic studies showed that Hyloctistes was embedded within Automolus. 

Two subspecies are recognised:
 Automolus subulatus lemae (Phelps & Phelps Jr, 1960) – southcentral and southeast Venezuela
 Automolus subulatus subulatus (von Spix, 1824) – southeast Colombia, west Brazil and north Bolivia

References

eastern woodhaunter
Birds of the Amazon Basin
eastern woodhaunter
Taxonomy articles created by Polbot